Keith Pupart (born 19 March 1985) is an Estonian volleyball player who plays for Romanian Divizia A1 club SCM U Craiova.

Estonian national team
As a member of the senior Estonia men's national volleyball team, Pupart competed at the 2009, the 2011 and the 2015 European Volleyball Championships. With the national team Pupart won the 2016 European Volleyball League title.

Sporting achievements

Clubs
Baltic League
  2006/2007 – with Selver Tallinn
  2007/2008 – with Selver Tallinn
  2008/2009 – with Selver Tallinn
  2020/2021 – with Saaremaa

National championship
 2003/2004  Estonian Championship, with Sylvester Tallinn
 2004/2005  Estonian Championship, with Audentes Tallinn
 2005/2006  Estonian Championship, with Selver Tallinn
 2006/2007  Estonian Championship, with Selver Tallinn
 2007/2008  Estonian Championship, with Selver Tallinn
 2008/2009  Estonian Championship, with Selver Tallinn
 2018/2019  Belgian Championship, with Noliko Maaseik
 2020/2021  Estonian Championship, with Saaremaa
 2012/2022  Romanian Championship, with SCM U Craiova

National cup
 2004/2005  Estonian Cup, with Audentes Tallinn
 2006/2007  Estonian Cup, with Selver Tallinn
 2007/2008  Estonian Cup, with Selver Tallinn
 2008/2009  Estonian Cup, with Selver Tallinn
 2011/2012  French Cup, with Rennes Volley 35
 2012/2013  French SuperCup, with Rennes Volley 35
 2018/2019  Belgian SuperCup, with Noliko Maaseik
 2019/2020  Estonian Cup, with Saaremaa

National team
 2016  European League

Individual
 2004 Young Estonian Volleyball Player of the Year
 2012 Estonian Volleyball Player of the Year

References

External links

1985 births
Living people
Sportspeople from Kuressaare
Estonian men's volleyball players
Estonian expatriate volleyball players
Expatriate volleyball players in Belgium
Estonian expatriate sportspeople in Belgium
Expatriate volleyball players in France
Estonian expatriate sportspeople in France
Expatriate volleyball players in Poland
Estonian expatriate sportspeople in Poland
Expatriate volleyball players in Romania
Estonian expatriate sportspeople in Romania